Thomas Godden, real name Tylden (1624 in Addington, Kent – 1 December 1688 in London) was an English courtier and Catholic priest, who was falsely implicated on charges of murder and treason in the Titus Oates or Popish plot, but managed to flee the country. He was later completely vindicated.

Life
His father, William Tylden, was able to provide a liberal education for his son and Thomas was sent first to a private school in Holborogh, conducted by a Mr. Gill, and in his fifteenth year entered Queen's College, Oxford. The next year found him at St John's College, Cambridge, and in 1640 he was made a Billingsley scholar. He received a B.A. in 1641, but the influence of John Sargeant, with whom he became acquainted during his college course, had induced him to enter the Catholic Church, and in 1642 the two set out for the English College, Lisbon. In due course, Godden was ordained, and so distinguished himself by his scholarship and controversial ability that in 1650 we find him lecturing in philosophy in the college. He rapidly ascended the ladder of academic distinction, and after being successively professor of theology, prefect of studies, and vice-president, succeeded Dr. Clayton as president of the college in 1655. Five years later he was thought worthy of the degree of Doctor of Divinity, and had established such a reputation for eloquence and piety that Princess Catherine of Braganza, about to marry Charles II, brought Godden to England with her, as her private chaplain. He was well received in his native country and enjoyed every evidence of royal favour.

Popish Plot
The disturbances caused by Oates' fabricated Popish plot, however, affected Godden very seriously. The informer and perjurer Miles Prance, (who was by trade a silversmith, with close connections to the Court) who had been arrested and imprisoned on suspicion of complicity in the Plot, upon being examined about the murder of Sir Edmund Berry Godfrey, swore that Godden and his servant Lawrence Hill had been concerned in the crime, and that Godfrey's corpse had been concealed for a time in Godden's apartments. Prance could suggest no plausible motive for the crime, merely saying vaguely that Godden had taken the side of two Irish priests, Fr. Kelly and Fr. Fitzgerald, in a quarrel with Godfrey, and that the quarrel for no clear reason led to murder. 

Why Prance named Godden and Hill as the assassins has never been clear, but he had been seriously ill-treated in prison (he was put in chains, denied a fire and almost froze to death) and threatened with torture. He was desperate to give the authorities information which might gain him his freedom, and possibly (as was the case with the earlier informers) secure for some financial reward. He may have named the first Catholics who came to his mind, or acted out of personal spite against Godden. Fr. Kelly, of whom nothing is known, may have been a figment of Prance's imagination, although Godden and Hill did know an Irish priest called Fitzgerald, who was employed in the household of the Venetian envoy.

Fearing that public indignation against everything Catholic would render an impartial investigation impossible, Godden managed to escape to the Continent, and took refuge in Paris. His lodgings in Somerset House were searched and Hill, despite the testimony of several witnesses (who included Godden's niece, Mary Tylden) who swore he was elsewhere at the time of the murder, and that  Godden's apartments were too small to conceal a body anyway,  was convicted and executed at Tyburn, 21 Feb. 1679, along with Henry Green and Robert Berry, his supposed co-conspirators. Mrs. Hill, at the trial, courageously accused Prance of perjury-"he knows all of this is as false as God is true"- and prophesied correctly that he would recant, but only when it was too late.

Later years
Later evidence, showing that Godden was in no way connected with Godfrey's death, altered public feeling: in 1686, just as Mrs. Hill had prophesied at her husband's trial, Miles Prance admitted that his charges against Hill, Berry, Green, FitzGerald and Godden had been a pure fabrication. In the reign of James II, he returned to his former post as almoner to the Queen Dowager. From this time until his death he took a prominent part in the religious controversies in England, and in 1686, with Bonaventure Giffard, defended the doctrine of the Real Presence, before the king, against Dr. William Jane and Dr. Simon Patrick. He was buried under the royal chapel in Somerset House.

Publications
Catholicks no Idolaters; or a full refutation of Dr. Stillingfleet's Unjust Charge of Idolatry against the Church of Rome (London, 1671); 
A Just Discharge to Dr. Stillingfleet's Unjust Charge of Idolatry against the Church of Rome. With a discovery of the Vanity of his late Defence . . . By way of a dialogue between Eunomius, a Conformist and Catharinus, a non-Conformist (Paris, 1677); 
A Sermon of St. Peter, preached before the Queen Dowager . . . on 29 June 1686 (London, 1686); 
A Sermon on the Nativity of Our Lord, preached before the Queen Dowager . . . at Somerset House (London, 1686). 
He also left a manuscript treatise on the Oath of Supremacy.

References

Attribution
 Cites:
Joseph Gillow, Bibl. Dict. Eng. Cath., II, 503
Paneani, Memoirs, p. 338
Anthony Wood, Athenæ Ozon., IV, 93, 674
Narcissus Luttrell, Hist. Relations of State Affairs, I, 391
Cath. Mag., V, 621; Vi, 59
The Tablet, 16 Feb., 1889, p. 257

External links

1624 births
1688 deaths
Alumni of St John's College, Cambridge
Alumni of The Queen's College, Oxford
History of Catholicism in England